Chignin is a commune in the Savoie department in the Auvergne-Rhône-Alpes region in south-eastern France.

The village of Chignin is located between the communes of Les Marches, Montmélian, Saint-Jeoire-Prieuré and Challes-les-Eaux, behind the Monronjoue downs in front of which the route nationale 6 runs.

It is famous for its white wine. Most Chignin is a scented dry white made from the local Jacquere grape variety.

Red wine accounts for only about 26% of Chignin's production. The most notable red grape varieties within the region are Gamay and Mondeuse Noire.

See also
Communes of the Savoie department

References

External links

Official site

Communes of Savoie